This is a list of the main career statistics of professional Spanish tennis player Paula Badosa.

Performance timelines

Only main-draw results in WTA Tour, Grand Slam tournaments, Fed Cup/Billie Jean King Cup and Olympic Games are included in win–loss records.

Singles
Current through the 2023 Dubai Open.

Doubles
Current after the 2022 WTA Tour.

Significant finals

WTA 1000 finals

Singles: 1 (1 title)

WTA career finals

Singles: 3 (3 titles)

ITF Circuit finals

Singles: 15 (7 titles, 8 runner–ups)

Junior Circuit finals

Grand Slam tournaments

ITF Circuit finals

Singles: 6 (3 titles, 3 runner–ups)

WTA Tour career earnings
Current after the 2022 Toray Pan Pacific Open

Career Grand Slam statistics

Seedings
The tournaments won by Badosa are in boldface, and advanced into finals by Badosa are in italics.

Best Grand Slam results details
Grand Slam winners are in boldface, and runner–ups in italics.

Head-to-head records

Record against top-10 players
Badosa's record against players who have been ranked in the top 10, active players are in boldface:

Record against No. 11–20 players 
Badosa's record against players who have been ranked world No. 11–20. Active players are in boldface:

  Anastasija Sevastova 
  Leylah Fernandez 
  Beatriz Haddad Maia 
  Elena Rybakina  
  Mihaela Buzărnescu 
  Alizé Cornet  
  Alison Riske   
  Markéta Vondroušová  
  Kaia Kanepi   
  Petra Martić   
  Peng Shuai   
  Karolína Muchová 
  Ekaterina Alexandrova 
  Liudmila Samsonova

No. 1 wins

Top-10 wins

Notes

References

Badosa, Paula